The Aion Hyper GT is an electric executive sedan to be produced by Chinese automobile manufacturer GAC Group and sold under its premium electric vehicle brand Aion. When the Hyper GT production starts, it will be the second vehicle of the Aion Hyper series after the Aion Hyper SSR sports car. The Hyper GT will also be the most aerodynamic mass-production car to-date at 0.19 cd, with the previous record being held by the Mercedes-Benz EQS at 0.20 cd.

Overview

The Aion Hyper GT was revealed on 30 December 2022 at Auto Guangzhou. It is planned to begin production and go on sale in October 2023.

Specifications
When production of the Aion Hyper GT begins, it will have the lowest-ever wind resistance coefficient of any mass-production car at 0.19 cd. The GAC research and development team used aerodynamic design cues featured in previous concepts such as the GAC ENO.146 and TIME to achieve the low drag coefficient of the Hyper GT.

While very minimal battery specifications for the Aion Hyper GT have been announced by GAC, the company has revealed that the single-motor version of the Hyper GT has an output of 250 kW and 434 Nm of torque, with a 0-100 km/h acceleration time of 4.9 seconds. The car is based on GAC's AEP 3.0 platform.

References

GAC Group
Hyper GT
2020s cars
Cars introduced in 2022
Cars of China
Production electric cars
Sedans